Jane Golden is an American artist who has been an active mural painter since the 1970s.

Background and education 
Following graduation from Stanford University, Golden moved to Los Angeles and created a number of large, well received murals in the Los Angeles beach areas, particularly in Santa Monica, in the late 1970s and early 1980s. She was co-founder and director of the Los Angeles Public Art Foundation.

In 1985, following a diagnosis of lupus, Golden left California to be with her family in the Philadelphia area, where she had grown up. In 1984, she founded Mural Arts Philadelphia, which grew out of a short-term anti-graffiti campaign. The program was designed to fight graffiti in the city by giving graffiti artists a more productive artistic outlet. She quickly began working with at risk teens. Together, they painted murals throughout the city and were trained in practical working skills. The program grew, and the Mural Arts Program has now created over 3600 murals to date.

In 2003, Golden received a Visionary Woman Award from Moore College of Art & Design. Eisenhower Fellowships selected Jane Golden as a USA Eisenhower Fellow in 2003. She is an instructor at the Pennsylvania Academy of Fine Art and teaches at the University of Pennsylvania.

Supporters of Golden urged her to run for Mayor of Philadelphia in 2015, an idea Golden said she was "intrigued by.

Art and community initiatives 
Golden has become an important voice and organizer within the community. Under her leadership, the Philadelphia Mural Arts Program actively engages with critical issues in the area. Their Porch Light program spotlights mental illness issues and homelessness and addiction, in cooperation with the Department of Behavioral Health. Golden has taught at Graterford Prison for many years and has also spearheaded a collaborative project connecting inmates and juveniles at a correction facility with a Kensington neighborhood. Connections at Graterford brought Golden to a position where she could support conceptual artist Peggy Diggs, who worked with inmates to construct shelters for disaster survivors. Some bemoan the quality of the murals developed through local participation as a model for developing the murals, citing uneven quality, artist Stephen Powers identifies Golden's success in convincing civic authorities that art can be an agent of positive change.

In 1989, Golden painted a mural in the Point Breeze section of Philadelphia with a group of neighborhood children titled "Stop the Violence", in honor of children from that neighborhood that had been killed by gun violence. In 2018, this mural was destroyed when the wall of the rowhome that contained it crumbled during the process of redevelopment, sparking controversy about the effects of gentrification in that neighborhood.

Awards 
 Katharine Hepburn Medal from Bryn Mawr College, Bryn Mawr PA, 2009
Governor's Award for the Arts (Pennsylvania) 2012 – Arts Innovation, Erie PA, 2012
Noam Chomsky Award, Justice Studies Association, 2013

Publications
 Philadelphia Murals and the Stories They Tell, Temple University Press (2002).   
 More Philadelphia murals and the stories they tell, Temple University Press (2006). 
Philadelphia Mural Arts @30, Temple University Press (2014).

References

External links 

Mural Arts Program
Defining Lives: Jane Golden, Philadelphia Inquirer, July 25, 2008
Power Lunch: Jane Golden for Mayor, Philadelphia Magazine, July 30, 2010
Mural Arts Director Jane Golden Awarded Hepburn Medal, Bryn Mawr Now, February 11, 2009
Biography, University of Pennsylvania
Biography, WHYY TV
Biography, Moore College of Art & Design
The art of change: As Philly redevelops, saving its cherished murals, Interview for WHYY, December 4, 2018

Artists from Philadelphia
American muralists
Living people
University of Pennsylvania faculty
Stanford University alumni
Rutgers University alumni
Year of birth missing (living people)